The Matapeake were a group of Native Americans living on Kent Island, Maryland at the time of English colonization in 1631. Their chief village was on the southeast side of the island. They were an Algonquian-language tribe and were related to the Nanticoke, another Algonquian-language tribe.

Matapeake, Maryland, a small unincorporated town in Maryland, was named for the Matapeake.

See also
 Native American tribes in Maryland

References

External links
History of Kent Island

Extinct Native American tribes
Eastern Algonquian peoples
Kent Island, Maryland
Native American tribes in Maryland
Extinct ethnic groups